Povina is a village and municipality in Kysucké Nové Mesto District in the Zilina Region of northern Slovakia.

History
In historical records the village was first mentioned in 1438.

Geography
It has a population of about 1,151 people.

References

Villages and municipalities in Kysucké Nové Mesto District